Education in Panama is compulsory for the first six years of primary education and the first three years of secondary school. As of the 2004/2005 school year there were about 430,000 students enrolled in grades one through six (95% attendance). The total enrollment in the six secondary grades for the same period was 253,900 (60% attendance). More than 91% of Panamanians are literate.

As of 2004, more than 92,500 Panamanian students attended the University of Panama, the Technological University of Panama, West Coast University – Panama, Polytechnic University of Central America and the University of Santa Maria La Antigua, a private Catholic institution. Including smaller colleges, there are 88 institutions of higher education in Panama.

History
Public education began in Panama soon after separating from Colombia in 1903. In 1906, the Panama College was found by Methodists. Nowadays it is called the Panamerican Institute. The first efforts were guided by a paternalistic view of the goals of education, as evidenced in comments made in a 1913 meeting of the First Panamanian Educational Assembly: "The cultural heritage given to the child should be determined by the social position he will or should occupy. For this reason, sex education should be different in accordance with the social class to which the student should be related." This elitist focus changed rapidly under United States influence.

By the 1920s, Panamanian education subscribed to a progressive educational system, explicitly designed to assist the able and ambitious individual in search of upward social mobility. Successive national governments gave a high priority to the development of a system of (at least) universal primary education. In the late 1930s, as much as one-fourth of the national budget went to education. Between 1920 and 1934, primary-school enrollment doubled. Adult illiteracy, more than 70 percent in 1923, dropped to roughly half the adult population in scarcely more than a decade.

By the early 1950s, adult illiteracy had dropped to 28 percent. The rate of gain had also declined and further improvements were slow in coming. The 1950s saw essentially no improvement; adult world life illiteracy was 27 percent in 1960. There were notable gains in the 1960s, however, and the rate of adult illiteracy dropped 8 percentage points by 1970. According to 1980 estimates, only 13 percent of Panamanians over 10 years of age were illiterate. Men and women were approximately equally represented among the literate. The most notable disparity was between urban and rural Panama; 94 percent of city-dwelling adults were literate but less than two-thirds of those in the countryside were—a figure that also represented continued high illiteracy rates among the country's Indian population.

From the 1950s through the early 1980s, education enrollments expanded faster than the rate of population growth as a whole and, for most of that period, faster than the school-age population. The steepest increases came in secondary and higher education enrollments, which increased ten and more than thirty times respectively. By the mid-1980s, primary school enrollment rates were roughly 113 percent of the primary-school-aged population. Male and female enrollments were relatively equal overall, although there were significant regional variations.

Enrollments at upper levels of schooling had increased strikingly in relative and absolute terms since 1960. Between 1960 and the mid-1980s, secondary-school enrollments expanded some four-and-a-half times and higher education nearly twelve-fold. In 1965, fewer than one-third of children of secondary school age were in school and only 7 percent of people ages 20 to 24 years. In the mid-1980s, almost two-thirds of secondary-school-age children were enrolled, and about 20 percent of individuals ages 20 to 24 years were in institutions of higher education.

Currently Panama has an overall literacy rate of more than 94%.

Educational levels of Panama

Preschool level 
The preschool level is aimed at children between 4 and 5 years old; There are two stages of education, pre-kindergarten and kindergarten, both with a duration of 1 year each.

Primary level 
The elementary level has a duration of 6 years and is aimed at students between the ages of six and twelve. Basic subjects such as Spanish, English, Mathematics, Natural Science, Social Science, Arts, Music, Technology, Physical Education, Home Education and Agriculture are taught.

First Step of Secondary Level  
The next stage is the pre-media cycle with a duration of 3 years, aimed at students between 12 and 15 years of age. At the end of this level the student receives the Certificate of General Basic Education. The objective is to favor that all students of school age reach, according to their potential, the full development of their abilities and skills to be able to follow their professional or work path.
The areas of study are: Spanish, Geography, History, Civics, Science, Technology, Typing, Arts, Industrial Arts, Music, Mathematics, Notions of Commerce and Accounting, Physical Education, Agriculture and English.

Second Step of Secondary Level 
It lasts 3 years (or 2 years in alternative schools) and is aimed at students between 15 and 18 years old. At the end of this stage the student receives the High School Diploma in one of the following modalities:
 Sciences
 Humanities
 Commerce
 Accounting 
 Information Technology
 Agriculture 
 Pedagogy 
 Tourism
 Maritime Services
 Technical modalities like: Cooling and Air Conditioning, Construction, Electricity, Electronics, Autotronic or Mechanical Technology
 Institutional Service and Management 
 Home Education
 Arts

The modality is chosen by the student just before the end of pre-media, and it cannot be changed afterwards, except in rare circumstances.

Higher Education 
Higher education in Panama is divided into 2 types: University Superior and Non-University Superior. University higher education is taught in several official and private universities.
Official or state universities are autonomous state educational entities dedicated to human development and high-quality professional training at an affordable cost. They are responsible for overseeing that the professional education given in private universities meets the highest quality standards, they are also responsible for homologating the degrees obtained in universities in other countries.
The State Universities of Panama are:
 Panama University
Autonomous University of Chiriqui
 Technology University of Panama
 International Maritime University of Panama
 Specialized University of the Americas

Private universities in Panama are duly accredited to offer a whole range of professions and are constantly evaluated to ensure the highest standard and quality of their careers:
Some private universities are:

 Santa María La Antigua Catholic University 
 Latin University of Panama
 University of the Isthmus
 University of Santander "" USantander ""
 American University of Panama
 Inter-American University of Distance Education
 Metropolitan University of Education Science and Technology "" UMECIT ""
 Inter-American University of Panama "" IPU ""
 Christian University of Panama
 Columbus University
 ISAE University
 INCAE University
 University of Art GANEXA
 University of the Caribbean

In general, undergraduate studies have a duration of 4 years, with the exceptions being exact sciences and engineering careers, that last 5 years and health sciences careers that last 6 years. Postgraduate studies have a duration that varies depending on the career.

Higher non-university education is made up of "Higher Education Institutes" or "Higher Education Centers" that provide diplomas and professional technical training of the highest level.

Among the State Superior Institutes are:

 National Institute for Vocational Training and Training for Human Development (INADEH)
 Superior Police Institute President Belisario Porras.
 Higher Institute of Agriculture
 Higher Institute of Aeronautical Vocational Training
 Panama International Banking Institute
 Higher Institute of Criminal Investigations and Forensic Sciences
 Higher Education Center "Dr.Justo Arosemena" of the National Police of Panama
 Superior Academy of Benemérito Fire Department of Panama
 Higher Technical Institute of the East

Among the private higher institutes are:

 Higher Polytechnic Institute of America
 Higher Institute of Computing Technology
 Higher Institute of Microfinance
 Higher Institute of Haute Cuisine (ISAC)
 Higher Institute of Science and Technology
 Higher Institute of Specialized Security
 Instituto Superior The Panama Internacional Hotel School
 Higher Institute of Commerce and Education
 Higher Institute of Education and Vocational Training
 Latin American Higher Institute of Naval Administration and Technology

 Higher Institute Fly Corporation Aviation Training
 Instituto Técnico Superior de Cocina, S.A.
 Higher Pedagogical Institute
 Cooperative Education Institute
 National Vocational Training Institute
 Center for Higher Education in Administration and Security
 ASSA Study Center
 Panama Regional Studies Center
 Center for Higher Studies
 Higher Studies Technical Center
 Higher Technology Center of Panama
 Albrook Flight Institute

References

External links
 Education in The Republic of Panama

 
Society of Panama